The title Hero of Abkhazia (Abkhaz: Аҧсны афырхаҵа Aṕsny Afyrhaca) is a state award of the Republic of Abkhazia.

Description
The medal is an eight-pointed star made of gilded metal, with rays radiating from the center. On the surface of the star there is a convex stylized image of the solar sign. In the center of the star is a precious stone. The gemstone provided for in the description was never used. The distance between the opposite ends of the eight-pointed star is 35 mm. The designer of the medal was Valery Gamgia.

Notable Recipients
 Vladislav Ardzinba
 Hovhannes Asatryan
 Shamil Basaev 
 Sergei Matosyan
 Sergei Bagapsh
 Vitaly Vulf
 Sultan Sosnaliyev
 Ashot Kosyan
 Gennady Nikichenko
 Vladimir Anua

Cities 
Two cities in Abkhazia were awarded the title Hero of Abkhazia in the form of a Hero City:

 Tkvarcheli
 Gudauta

References

Awards established in 1992
Medals